Acacia semitrullata is a shrub of the genus Acacia and the subgenus Phyllodineae that is endemic to south western Australia.

Description
Like most species of Acacia it has phyllodes rather than true leaves. It blooms from May to October and produces cream-white flowers.

Taxonomy
The species was first formally described by the botanist Bruce Maslin in 1978 as part of the work Studies in the genus Acacia. A revision of the Uninerves - Triangulares in the journal Nuytsia. It was reclassified as Racosperma semitrullatum by Leslie Pedley in 2003 then transferred back to genus Acacia in 2006.

Distribution
It is native to a small area in the South West region of Western Australia where it is commonly situated on sandplains or in swampy areas growing in clay or sandy soils, sometimes over laterite. the range of the shrub extends from around Yarloop in the north down to around Collie and the Whicher Range in the south where it found growing in open heathland surrounding swamps in open jarrah forest communities.

See also
 List of Acacia species

References

semitrullata
Acacias of Western Australia
Taxa named by Bruce Maslin
Plants described in 1978